The 14th Rhein-Pokalrennen (Rhine-Cup Race), was the Round Eight of the 1979 European Championship for F2 Drivers. This was the second time F2 visited the Hockenheimring, during the 1979 season, with the race on 10 June.

Report

Entry
A total of 30 F2 cars were entered for the event, however just 24 took part in qualifying. As with previous F2 events at Hockenheim, the race would be run over two heats, and the result aggregated to decide the winner.

Qualifying
Stephen South took pole position for the Project Four Racing – ICI Racing Team, in his March-BMW 792, for both Heats.

Race
The final was held over 40 laps of the Hockenheim Grand Prix circuit, split into two 20 lap heats. Stephen South took impressive lights-to-flag victories in both heats, for the Project Four Racing – ICI Racing Team, in their March-BMW 792. South won in an aggregated time of 1hr 20:56.57mins., averaging a speed of 126.004 mph. Second place went to his team-mate, Derek Daly. The best of the works March's was Beppe Gabbiani in third, ahead of Patrick Gaillard, Marc Surer and Bobby Rahal.  Guest driver, Hans-Joachim Stuck had pushed South hard during Heat 1, before retiring with engine failure.

Classification

Aggregate Results

 Fastest lap: Alberto Colombo, 1:59.98secs. (127.200 mph)

Heat 1

Heat 2

References

European Formula Two Championship
Rhein-Pokalrennen
Rhein